Fernhill School may refer to:
Fernhill School, Oakville, a secondary private school in Oakville, Ontario, Canada
Fernhill School, Burlington, a secondary private school in Burlington, Ontario, Canada
Fernhill School, Farnborough, a secondary school in Hampshire, England
Fernhill School, Rutherglen, an independent school in South Lanarkshire, Scotland

See also
Fernhill (disambiguation)